The women's 400 metres event at the 1987 Pan American Games was held in Indianapolis, United States on 12 and 13 August.

Medalists

Results

Heats

Final

References

Athletics at the 1987 Pan American Games
1987
Pan